The Sarawak People's National Party or  (PNRS), also known by the acronyms "NEGARA" and was initially known as "Parti PEACE" is a minor Sarawakian political party which was formed in July 1974. It was rumoured to be secretly funded by United Bumiputera Heritage Party (PBB) of Sarawak Barisan Nasional (BN) to split opposition votes although the claim was never verified.

See also
Politics of Malaysia
List of political parties in Malaysia

References

Defunct political parties in Sarawak
1974 establishments in Malaysia
Political parties established in 1974